The Honda HR-V is a subcompact crossover SUV (B-segment) manufactured and marketed by Honda over three generations.

The first generation HR-V was based on the Honda Logo. It was marketed from 1999 to 2006 in Europe, Japan and select Asia-Pacific markets – and featured three doors (1999–2003) or five doors (1999–2006). The two configurations were internally designated GH2 and GH4 respectively.

After a hiatus between 2006 and 2013, Honda reintroduced the nameplate for the second generation HR-V, based on the third-generation Honda Fit.

For the third-generation model, the nameplate is split between two different vehicles, one for the global market (sold as the Vezel in Japan), and a larger model based on the eleventh-generation Civic destined for North America and China. The latter will also be sold in other markets as the Honda ZR-V.

According to Honda, the name "HR-V" stands for "Hi-rider Revolutionary Vehicle", while the name "Vezel" is coined from "bezel", the oblique faces of a cut gem, with the "V" for "vehicle".

First generation (GH; 1998) 

The HR-V debuted as the J-WJ concept, one of the four concepts in Honda's J-Mover Series unveiled at the 1997 Tokyo Motor Show and the 1998 Geneva Motor Show. With minimal changes from the concept, the HR-V was marketed exclusively in Japan via Honda's Verno dealership network, aimed at a young demographic. The HR-V was subsequently marketed in Europe with either a Honda D16W1 type 1.6-litre SOHC (FWD or 4WD) or a SOHC VTEC Honda D16W5 type engine (exclusively 4WD). A continuously variable transmission was optional.

The HR-V shared its platform with the Honda Logo, and was manufactured in Suzuka, Japan.  The all-wheel drive configuration was initially available in a three-door body in February 1999 and was internally designated the GH2. In September 1999, Honda introduced a front-wheel drive, three door variant. Five door models were designated GH4 and were introduced in March 2000. At this time, Honda offered a  VTEC engine option for both the three and five-door four-wheel drive models. Neither a five-door front-wheel drive, or a front-wheel drive model with the VTEC engine were marketed.

The five-door was 110 mm longer overall, with a 100 mm longer wheelbase (2,460 mm). Suspension on all models was via MacPherson strut front suspension and a five-link De Dion-type rear suspension.

In advance of European pedestrian protection legislation, the HR-V was designed to minimize pedestrian injuries in the event of an impact.  Equipment featured ABS brakes with EBD (electronic brakeforce distribution), dual SRS (supplemental restraint system) airbags, as well as folding power mirrors, power windows, folding rear seats, power steering, heat absorbing glazing, air conditioning, front fog lights and a rear spoiler with an LED center high-mounted brake light. A 285-litre cargo area was equipped with cargo hooks, a subdivided underfloor compartment, and 50:50 split-fold rear seats. Options included body colour roof rails and a large rear roof spoiler.

The Real Time 4WD system, shared with the CR-V, uses a dual hydraulic pump rear differential where the 4WD system is hydraulically activated when the front wheels lose traction. The HR-V was noted for its low nitrous oxide emissions.

The HR-V received an exterior and interior facelift for model year 2002.

Engines

Second generation (RU; 2013) 

The second generation HR-V was previewed as the Urban SUV Concept which was unveiled at the 2013 North American International Auto Show. The concept version was said to be based on Honda's Global Compact Series, which includes the Honda Fit subcompact and the Honda City subcompact sedan.

The vehicle was unveiled in November 2013 at the Tokyo Motor Show as the Vezel. Based on the Honda Fit platform, at the time of its introduction it was the smallest SUV from Honda, below the CR-V.  The exterior design of the crossover is inspired by coupés with its sloping roof, and a unique design element like hidden rear door handles.

Honda has described its cabin as “exceptionally versatile,” due to the inclusion the Magic Seats system carried over from the Fit which enables the lower part of the rear seat to be folded up to carry tall items.

The HR-V's body uses 27% ultra-high-strength steel grades, of either of 780, 980 or 1,500 MPa yield strength.

Facelift

Markets

Japan 
The Japanese Vezel models went on sale on 20 December 2013. The Vezel was available with two powertrains, as a conventional gasoline-powered and as hybrid electric vehicle. In Japan, the hybrid version was expected to account for 90 percent of the Vezel sales. Its width dimension exceeds Japanese government dimension regulations (1,700 mm) which means Japanese buyers are liable for extra yearly taxes as a result.

The conventional Vezel is equipped with a 1.5-litre direct-injection DOHC i-VTEC inline-four engine coupled to a continuously variable transmission (CVT7), and it is available in front-wheel and all-wheel drive versions.

The hybrid version fuel economy is  (3.7 L/100 km) in the Japanese JC08 cycle, while the gasoline version has a fuel economy of  (4.9 L/100 km) in the JC08 cycle.

The facelifted model was unveiled on 25 January 2018 in Japan and released later on 15 February 2018. It features a revised chrome bar grille and LED headlamps both being similar to Honda Civic, thin chrome garnish strip on the rear trunk and updated front bumper.

North America 
The second-generation Honda HR-V debuted at the 2014 New York International Auto Show as a concept car, with the production model unveiled later at the 2014 Los Angeles Auto Show. The HR-V was introduced in the United States in 2015 as a 2016 model. It shares the same platform as the third-generation Fit and is largely identical to the Vezel, which went on sale in Japan in December 2013. The HR-V is smaller than both CR-V and Pilot, again (after the demise of Element) giving Honda a model range with three crossover SUVs.

The US-market HR-V is manufactured at Honda's Celaya, Mexico assembly plant alongside the related Fit and went on sale in May 2015 as a 2016 model. It is powered by a 1.8-litre SOHC i-VTEC I4 engine mated either to a CVT7 transmission similar to the Civic or a 6-speed manual transmission (FWD only).

For the 2019 model year, Honda announced the mid-cycle refresh for the HR-V. It features a revised chrome bar grille being similar to Honda Civic and new headlamp design featuring a single projector lens with DRLs or full LED headlamp similar to the Civic Touring, updated bumper design and overhead roof rails. There are now two headlight options as well; full LED headlights for the touring trim, or LED projector headlights for the other trims. On the interior, Apple CarPlay and Android Auto has been made available. The head unit is now updated and features a volume knob replacing the volume slider. Honda Sensing is standard on EX trims and higher. Although the manual transmission is no longer available, Honda tweaked the CVT7 transmission as well as the optional AWD system. Two new trim levels for the HR-V, Sport and Touring, were added to the trim lineup, now ranging from LX, Sport, EX, EX-L, and Touring.

China 
In China, the vehicle is manufactured and marketed by two separate joint ventures with different names and cosmetic changes. Guangqi Honda revealed the vehicle with the Vezel nameplate in October 2014. It is mostly identical with the global model. Inside, the dual-tone interior features black and orange finish instead of a full grey theme.

In November 2014, Dongfeng Honda released its own version called the Honda XR-V. Previewed by the XR-V Concept in September 2014, it features a redesigned front and rear fascia and door panel sheet metals as it is positioned as a more aggressive looking vehicle. In the rear end, the taillights have been replaced with narrower, LED lights that span the entire width of the rear end. The interior is slightly different from the Vezel with the horizontal HVAC vents replaced by round vents. Both the Vezel and XR-V are powered with a 1.5-litre or 1.8-litre i-VTEC petrol engines.

Honda revealed the facelifted XR-V in February 2020 featuring an updated front fascia and rear bumper. The engine options of the facelift model includes a 1.5-litre VTEC Turbo engine and a 1.5-litre i-VTEC naturally aspirated engine.

Electric versions 
The first battery electric version of the Honda Vezel was marketed by Guangqi Honda as the Everus VE-1 in China, based on the Everus EV concept. The production model debuted in November 2019. The electric version of the Honda XR-V was marketed by Dongfeng Honda as the Ciimo XN-V, based on the XN-V Concept. Production began in October 2019. Another electric version released by Dongfeng Honda is the Ciimo M-NV which was revealed in November 2020 which sports a new front and rear fascia design, and a completely redesigned interior with a 12.3-inch TFT instrument cluster and push-button gear selector.

Europe 
The HR-V was unveiled in the European market in September 2014 as the HR-V Prototype. The specs was further detailed in February 2015, and it went on sale in September 2015.

Thailand 
In Thailand, the HR-V went on sale on 17 November 2014. It is powered by 1.8-litre engine with four trim levels namely S, E, E Limited and EL.

Singapore 
In Singapore, the official Honda distributor sells the HR-V, while the parallel imported version retains the name Vezel.

Parallel importers brought in the petrol, RS and hybrid versions, while the official Honda distributor only brought in the petrol version.

Indonesia 
In Indonesia, the HR-V was revealed as a prototype model at the 22nd Indonesia International Motor Show on 18 September 2014 and went on sale on 24 January 2015 as a locally assembled model. It is offered with 1.5-litre and 1.8-litre engine options. The 1.5-litre option were available in the base model A with manual transmission, slightly more equipped S with either manual or CVT7, and the CVT7 only E trim. The only trim available for 1.8-litre variant is the Prestige which is equipped with LED projector headlights with daytime running lights, two-tone alloy wheels, full leather interior and panoramic roof. Mugen body kits were optional for the 1.5 E and 1.8 Prestige variants.

The facelifted HR-V was launched at the 26th Gaikindo Indonesia International Auto Show on 2 August 2018. The 1.5 S and 1.5 E trims received projector headlights, while the 1.5 E Special Edition and 1.8 Prestige received full LED headlights and LED fog lights. The 1.5 A trim was dropped.

Malaysia 
The HR-V was launched in Malaysia in February 2015 as a locally assembled model with three trim levels: S, E and V. All variants were updated in May 2016 where the previously offered 16 inch alloy wheels were swapped for 17 inch. A limited 'Mugen' edition based on the V trim was launched in February 2018 and was limited to 1,020 units. Bookings open for the facelift version in July 2018 and in November 2018, a facelift HR-V was showcased during the 2018 Kuala Lumpur International Motor Show. In January 2019, the facelifted HR-V was launched with four trims: 1.8 E, 1.8 V, 1.8 RS and Sport Hybrid i-DCD. Malaysia became the only country outside of Japan to officially market the Vezel/HR-V hybrid. It was reported that 3,000 facelifted HR-V units was delivered with a total of 8,500 bookings. Fast forward to August 2021, Honda Malaysia announced prices for the updated HR-V Hybrid. Coming in at RM114k, it gets an updated kit list that's similar to the 1.8V model. This includes LED headlights and foglight, a seven-inch touchscreen with Apple CarPlay and Android Auto and a new colour choice.

Philippines 
The HR-V was launched on 9 June 2015 and it was offered in three trim levels: S, E and EL. All models are only offered with the 1.8-litre engine matted with a CVT transmission.

The facelifted HR-V was launched on 24 August 2018 and it is offered in two trim levels: 1.8 E and 1.8 RS.

Taiwan 
The HR-V was introduced in Taiwan in October 2016 and is only available with the 1.8-litre engine. It comes in three different trims, the VTi, VTi-S and S. All models feature a CVT transmission, with the VTi featuring seven gear ratios (including L), whereas the VTi-S and S have five gear ratios. For the 2019 refresh, the VTi model was discontinued. The refresh also brought the CVT gearbox to the VTi-S model, as well as several other minor tweaks, like 17-inch alloy wheels (up from 16-inch). The S trim was updated with full LED lights, an updated entertainment system with improved reversing camera and a few other minor tweaks.

Brazil 
The Brazil-market HR-V, assembled locally at Honda's plant in the state of São Paulo and also imported from Argentina, went on sale in first-quarter 2015 as a 2016 model. For the first nine months of 2015, Honda's production in Brazil was reported to increase by 20 percent as a result of the launch of HR-V compared with a 20% drop for the industry.

On 21 May 2020, the last HR-V rolled out the assembly line of the Argentinian plant, marking the closure of the plant. This means Brazil is the only producer of the HR-V in South America.

Others 
The HR-V was launched in Pakistan in 2016 but was later discontinued owing to poor sales. Despite being a global model, Honda did not market the second-generation HR-V in India where it has significant operations, citing uncompetitive pricing compared to its rivals and potentially high investment for the localization of components. A Honda executive cited an example of the crossover's electric parking brake which comes standard with the vehicle that would inflate the cost, while the vehicle was not designed with a manual handbrake in mind. Honda offered the cheaper Brio-based BR-V and the Fit/Jazz-based WR-V instead. The company has started a project from late 2017 to produce and market the second-generation HR-V in India from December 2019, only to be shelved again due to low sales forecast.

Powertrain

Safety
 + - ANCAP (2015) - 
  - ASEAN NCAP:
  (applies to models equipped with only driver's seat-belt reminder)
  (applies to models equipped with two seat-belt reminders)
 + - Euro NCAP - 
  - NHTSA -

Recall 
Vezel Hybrid produced in Japan from July 2013 through February 2014 were recalled due to a problem with the software program controlling the 7-speed dual clutch transmission (DCT) which could cause a delay in the ability to begin driving or the inability to move at all.

Honda recalled 160,000 Fit subcompact and Vezel sport-utility vehicles, manufactured from August 2013 through February 2016 in Japan, because of defective power steering and a part that controls the electric current in the vehicles. The recall does not affect any Honda models sold abroad.

Third generation 
The third-generation HR-V is split into two different models for different markets. The global model (with "RV" model code) was first introduced in 2021 and has been produced in Japan, Thailand, Indonesia, Malaysia, Brazil, Taiwan, China and Pakistan while also marketed in Europe. The North American market received a different and larger model (with "RZ" model code) which is claimed to "meet the distinct needs of U.S. customers", and will be sold outside North America as the Honda ZR-V.

Global version (RV; 2021) 

The second-generation Vezel/third-generation HR-V for markets outside of North America was unveiled in Japan on 18 February 2021. Sales began in Japan on 22 April 2021, with the European-spec HR-V being detailed in the same day. The basic Vezel G receives a regular 1.5-litre petrol engine, producing  at 6,600 rpm. The European market HR-V is only available with a hybrid powertrain.

According to specifications issued for the Australian market, the boot capacity is smaller than its predecessor, measuring 304 litres with the rear seats in place and 1274 litres with the back seats folded using the VDA measurement, down from 437 litres and 1462 litres respectively.

Markets

China 
A battery electric version of the third-generation HR-V was revealed in China in October 2021 as the Honda e:NS1 and e:NP1, which will be manufactured by Dongfeng Honda and Guangqi Honda respectively. Both are based on the e:N Architecture F platform for smaller, front-wheel-drive battery electric vehicles.

The petrol models were unveiled in 2022, starting with the XR-V in July which adopted the exterior styling of the HR-V RS marketed in Southeast Asia, and later followed by Vezel in October which adopted the exterior styling of regular HR-V model.

Thailand 
The Thai market HR-V was unveiled on 5 November 2021. Assembled locally, it is only available with a hybrid powertrain. Trim levels offered are E, EL, and RS.

Indonesia 
The third-generation HR-V was launched in Indonesia on 23 March 2022. It is offered with either a 1.5-litre petrol or a 1.5-litre turbo petrol engine, both mated to a CVT. The former is available on S, E, and SE trim levels, while the latter is exclusively available on RS trim. Honda Sensing is standard across all trim levels.

Philippines 
The third-generation HR-V was launched in the Philippines on 19 April 2022 in S and V Turbo grades, while the HR-V RS Turbo grade was launched during the 8th Philippine International Motor Show on 15 September 2022. It is offered in either a 1.5-litre petrol or a 1.5-litre turbo petrol engine, both mated to a CVT transmission, with the former being offered on the S grade, while the latter is offered on V  and RS grades. Honda Sensing is standard across all models.

Australia 
The third-generation HR-V was launched in Australia on 12 May 2022. It is offered with either a 1.5-litre petrol engine or a 1.5-litre hybrid (e:HEV), both mated to a CVT transmission, with the former being offered on the Vi X grade, while the latter is offered on e:HEV L grade. Honda Sensing is standard across all models. The Australian market HR-V is only certified as a four-seater instead of five due to the lack of a top tether point for the middle seat, which is required by Australian Design Rules.

Vietnam 
The third-generation HR-V was launched in Vietnam on 15 June 2022 in L and RS Turbo grades, while the HR-V G grade was launched on 15 December 2022. It is offered in either a 1.5-litre petrol or a 1.5-litre turbo petrol engine, both mated to a CVT transmission, with the former being offered on the G grade, while the latter is offered on L and RS grades. Honda Sensing is standard across all models.

Malaysia 
The third-generation HR-V was launched in Malaysia on 14 July 2022, and it became available on retail sales by August 2022. It is offered in three engines: a 1.5-litre petrol engine, a 1.5-litre turbo petrol engine, or a 1.5-litre hybrid (e:HEV), all mated to a CVT transmission. The standard 1.5-litre engine is offered on the S grade, the turbo engine are offered on both E and V grades, and the e:HEV variant is offered on the RS grade. Honda Sensing is standard across all models.

Brazil 
The Brazilian market third-generation HR-V was introduced on 1 July 2022. It will offered with either a 1.5-litre petrol engine or a 1.5-litre turbo petrol engine engine, both mated to a CVT. The former will be available on EX and EXL trim levels, while the latter will be available on Advance and Touring trim levels, Honda Sensing is standard across all trim levels. The third-generation HR-V became available in August 2022 for 1.5-litre naturally aspirated engine models and it become available in October 2022 for 1.5-litre turbo models.

Pakistan 
The third-generation HR-V was launched in Pakistan on 21 October 2022.

Safety 
In a Euro NCAP testing conducted in 2022, the HR-V e:HEV received a four-star rating.

North American and Chinese version/ZR-V (RZ; 2022) 

A separate North American HR-V model was unveiled on 4 April 2022 and has been sold since 7 June 2022 for the 2023 model year. Based on the eleventh-generation Civic and categorised as a C-segment SUV, it will also be sold outside of North America, such as in China (as the ZR-V and HR-V) and Europe (as the ZR-V) to slot between the global HR-V model and the CR-V. Chinese models are produced by both Guangqi Honda (ZR-V) and Dongfeng Honda (HR-V) respectively. European models will use full hybrid powertrain as standard.

Sales

China

References

External links 

  (UK)

HR-V
Cars introduced in 1999
2000s cars
2010s cars
2020s cars
Mini sport utility vehicles
Crossover sport utility vehicles
Front-wheel-drive vehicles
All-wheel-drive vehicles
ASEAN NCAP small off-road
Euro NCAP small off-road
Latin NCAP small off-road
Production electric cars
Vehicles with CVT transmission